Wolf Creek is a census-designated place in Weber County, Utah, United States. Its population was 1,336 as of the 2010 census.

Geography

See also

 List of census-designated places in Utah

References

External links

Census-designated places in Utah
Census-designated places in Weber County, Utah